Naomi Kate Wynn Wilson  (born 27 January 1940) is a former teacher and Tanzanian-born Australian politician, who was a National Party member of the Legislative Assembly of Queensland from 1995 to 1998, as which she represented the district of Mulgrave. 

Wilson is the daughter of the Welsh Anglican Bishop of Central Tanganyika, William (Bill) Wynn Jones, and of Ruth L. Minton Taylor, and the great-granddaughter of the former senator and Premier of Tasmania, Henry Dobson. Wilson was born in Arusha in Tanganyika (now Tanzania). 

Wilson was a Mulgrave Shire councillor from 1991 to 1995. Wilson entered state parliament at the 1995 state election by defeating incumbent Labor Party MP Warren Pitt for the seat of Mulgrave. When the National Party came to power under the leadership Rob Borbidge in February 1996, Wilson was appointed Parliamentary Secretary to the Minister for Families, Youth and Community Care. In February 1998 she won promotion to the ministry, becoming the Minister for Families, Youth and Community Care. Wilson held this position until her defeat the following June at the 1998 state election, where she finished in third place behind Labor's Warren Pitt and victorious One Nation candidate Charles Rappolt.

When Rappolt prematurely retired in late 1998 Wilson stood as the endorsed National Party candidate for the Mulgrave by-election, in which she lost slightly to Labor's Warren Pitt. Wilson stood as the National Party candidate in the neighbouring district Cairns during the 2001 state election in which she was defeated by incumbent Labor MP Desley Boyle.

References

                   

1940 births
Living people
National Party of Australia members of the Parliament of Queensland
Members of the Queensland Legislative Assembly
Tanzanian emigrants to Australia
Women members of the Queensland Legislative Assembly